Carl Russell Channell (May 25, 1945 - March 15, 1990) was an American political fundraiser and lobbyist.

Early life
Channell was born on May 25, 1945, in Elkins, West Virginia. He served in the United States Army in Germany during the Vietnam War era, and he graduated from American University.

Career
Channell began his career as a motel manager in West Virginia.

Channell became a conservative political fundraiser in 1979. Via the National Endowment for the Preservation of Liberty, Channell attempted to "stall" the sanctions of the Anti-Apartheid Movement in South Africa. He participated in the fundraising for Contras and was later convicted in the Iran Contra affair.

Death
Channell died on May 7, 1990, in Washington, D.C.

References

1945 births
1990 deaths
American lobbyists
American political fundraisers
American University alumni
People from Elkins, West Virginia
United States Army soldiers